Francis Roy "Minnie" McGiffin, last name sometimes spelt McGiffen, (March 2, 1890 – August 30, 1918) was a Canadian professional ice hockey player. He played for the Toronto Blueshirts of the Canadian National Hockey Association (NHA) from 1912 to 1915. He was a member of the 1914 Stanley Cup championship Blueshirts team.

Playing career
Roy McGiffin played amateur hockey from age 15 with the Coldwater Hockey Club, moving from there to Toronto Simcoe, Toronto Amateur Athletic Club and back to Toronto Simcoe for the 1909–10 season. He played the 1911–12 season for Cleveland Athletic Club, before turning professional with the Toronto Blueshirts in 1912–13. He played three seasons with the Blueshirts before retiring after the 1914–15 season.

In the 1914 Stanley Cup challenge of Victoria Aristocrats against the Blueshirts, McGiffin scored the game-winning goal of game two. That season, he led the league in penalty fines of $116.

In a February 17, 1915 regular-season game against the Ottawa Senators, McGiffin became involved in a fight with Art Ross that ended with both players being arrested by Toronto police. After spending the night in jail, both players were fined $1. McGiffin lost a coin toss with Ross and paid both fines. The referee of the match Cooper Smeaton wanted McGiffin barred from the league, denouncing him as a rough player.

After the 1914–15 season, he quit hockey for business and moved to Dinuba, California. He had lived there previously for a year from 1910–11 after his junior hockey days. In June 1917 he married Lillian Schroeder of San Francisco.

McGiffin served in the U.S. Army Air Service during World War I, and was an instructor of aerobatics. On August 30, 1918, Flight-Lieutenant McGiffin was killed in an airplane crash about a mile and a half northeast of Call Field in Wichita Falls, Texas. He was looping at an altitude of 2,000 feet when his plane crashed.

Playing style
Roy McGiffin was known as a rough player, somewhat in the mold of a modern day enforcer, and he collected a total amount of 300 penalty minutes over 51 games during his three year long NHA career. But Jack Marshall, a teammate of McGiffin on the Toronto Blueshirts and a subsequent Hockey Hall of Fame inductee, thought McGiffin's reputation as a violent player was exaggerated and claimed that most of his violent outbursts were for intimidation purposes only:

It seemed not everyone agreed on Marshall's assertion of McGiffin as a "good little fellow." According to Montreal Gazette sports journalist Dink Carroll, longtime NHL referee Mike Rodden, when asked about McGiffin, claimed "[McGiffin] wasn't a bad man. He was a mad man."

Career statistics

* Stanley Cup ChampionSource: Society for International Hockey Research

References

Notes

Bibliography
 

Toronto Blueshirts players
Stanley Cup champions
1890 births
1918 deaths
Canadian ice hockey left wingers
United States Army Air Service pilots of World War I
American military personnel killed in World War I